Péter Nádas (born 14 October 1942) is a Hungarian writer, playwright, and essayist.

Biography 

He was born in Budapest into a Jewish family, the son of László Nádas (originally Nussbaum) and Klára Tauber. After the takeover of the Hungarian Nazis, the Arrow Cross Party on 15 October 1944, Klára Tauber escaped with her son to Bačka and Novi Sad, but returned to the capital directly before the Siege of Budapest. Péter Nádas survived the siege together with his mother in the flat of his uncle, the journalist Pál Aranyossi.

Even though his parents were illegal Communists during World War II and involved with the Communist administration later on, as well, they had both their sons—Péter and Pál—baptized in the Reformed (Calvinist) Church of Pozsonyi Street. His mother died of an illness when he was 13. In 1958, his father—head of department in one of the ministries, slandered with accusations of embezzlement, then exonerated by the court of all charges—committed suicide; Péter Nádas became an orphan at 16. Magda Aranyossi became the guardian of the two children.

Between 1961 and 1963 Péter Nádas studied journalism and photography. He worked as a journalist at a Budapest magazine (Pest Megyei Hírlap) from 1965 to 1969. He also worked as a playwright and a photographer. Since 1969 he has been a freelancer.

In 1990 he married Magda Salamon (with whom he had been living since 1962).  In 1984 they moved to a small village in western Hungary, Gombosszeg, where they have resided ever since, though he also has a residence in the Castle District of Buda.

In 1993, he was elected member of the Széchenyi Academy of Literature and Arts.

Since the early 1970s, he has frequently spent time in Berlin, Germany, attending lectures at Humboldt University or reading in the Staatsbibliothek. He has been a fellow of the Wissenschaftskolleg zu Berlin, Institute for Advanced Study. In 2006, he was elected a member of the Akademie der Künste, Berlin. He enjoys a high reputation in Germany.

Works 

After publishing volumes of short stories, he published his first novel The End of a Family Story in 1977.

He published his second novel, A Book of Memories in 1986. It took Nádas twelve years to write this book. The epigraph of this novel is from the Gospel according to John: "But he spoke of the temple of his body" (John, 2.21).  In this novel, Nádas describes the world as a system of relations linking human bodies to each other. This book earned Nádas comparisons to Proust.

He published his latest novel, the three-volume Parallel Stories (I: The Mute Realm, II: In the Very Depth of the Night, III: The Breath of Freedom) in 2005. This novel is a multitude of independent stories that melt into one single narrative. It took Nádas eighteen years to complete this book. The novel has been described as "a virtuoso combination of nineteenth-century high realism with the experimentalism of the nouveau roman", while "the real narrative is that of bodies' actions on one another, their attraction and desires, their mutual memories" (Gábor Csordás). The plot is constructed around the histories of two families: one—the Lippay-Lehrs, who are Hungarian, the other—the Döhrings, who are German. These two main threads link irregularly up to one another via specific events or figures.

Nádas' other novels include Lovely Tale of Photography,  Yearbook, On Heavenly and Earthly Love, and A Dialogue with Richard Swartz. Death is a recurrent theme in Nádas' work, particularly in Own Death,  based on his experience of clinical death.

His writing has been described as intellectual, detailed, strong, innovative, and demanding. He is the winner of the Würth-Preis für Europäische Literatur in 2014. A volume of interviews with Péter Nádas, by Zsófia Mihancsik (Nincs mennyezet, nincs födém) was published in 2006.

Bibliography
Works translated into English:

Parallel Stories: A Novel
A Lovely Tale of Photography
The End of a Family Story
A Book of Memories(New York)(London)
"A Tale About Fire and Knowledge" in the anthology Caught in a Story 
Love
Own Death
Fire and Knowledge: Fiction and Essays

Awards 

He has received numerous awards, including 
 1989 Prize for Hungarian Art, Hungary.
 1991 Austrian State Prize for European Literature, Austria.
 1992 Kossuth Prize, Hungary.
 1995 Leipzig Book Award for European Understanding, Germany.
 1998 Vilenica International Prize for Literature, Slovenia.
 1998 Prix du Meilleur Livre Étranger (Prize for the Best Foreign Book), France.
 2003 Franz Kafka Prize, Czech Republic.
 2014 Würth-Preis für Europäische Literatur, Germany.

He has also been nominated for the Nobel Prize.

References

External links 

 Gábor Csordás: The body of the text. Corporeal writing in Péter Nádas's "Parallel Stories"
 Ottilie Mulzet: A la recherche de corps perdus: Notes from a reading of Péter Nádas's A néma tartomány (The Mute Realm)
 Multilingual Literature Database of the Hungarian Book Foundation
 Péter Nádas: Burial
 Susan Sontag: Nádas's Comedy of Interment
 

1942 births
Living people
Writers from Budapest
Hungarian Jews
Hungarian Protestants
Hungarian Calvinist and Reformed Christians
Postmodern writers
Members of the Academy of Arts, Berlin
Members of the Széchenyi Academy of Literature and Arts